Rear Admiral Richard Derek Leaman,  (born 27 July 1956) is a British charity executive and former senior Royal Navy officer. Since 2017, he has been chief executive officer of the Tall Ships Youth Trust. He was previously CEO of The Guide Dogs for the Blind Association (2010 to 2016).

Early life and education
Leaman was born on 29 July 1956 in Lynton, Devon, England, to Derek Alan Leaman and Jean Rita Leaman. He was educated at Torquay Boys' Grammar School, an all-boys state grammar school in Torquay, Devon. Later in life, he studied at Manchester Business School and completed the Advanced Management Achievement Course in 2010.

Career

Military career
In 1975, Leaman began one years training at the Britannia Royal Naval College. He was commissioned into the Royal Navy in 1976. On 1 January 1980, he was promoted to lieutenant and granted seniority in that rank from 1 March 1979. In 1982, he attended the Principal warfare officer Course and won the Edgerton Gunnery Prize; he was the youngest ever PWO. He was promoted to lieutenant commander on 1 March 1987, to commander in 1991, and to captain in 1996. He commanded the offshore patrol vessel HMS Dumbarton Castle from 1991 to 1992, the Type 42 destroyer HMS Cardiff from 1993 to 1994, and Type 22 frigate HMS Cumberland from 1999 to 2000.

In 2000, having attended the Higher Command and Staff Course, Leaman was promoted to commodore. He served as Director of communications for the Royal Navy from 2000 to 2001, Commander of the UK Maritime Task Group (COMUKTG) from 2002 to 2003, and Director of the Higher Command and Staff Course from 2003 to 2005. In 2004, having attended the Defence Strategic Leadership Course, he was promoted to rear admiral. He served as Chief of staff at the Allied Maritime Command Naples from 2005 to 2007, and as Deputy Chief of Staff at NATO Strategic Command in Norfolk, Virginia, United States from 2007 to 2009.

Leaman officially retired from the Royal Navy on 31 March 2010.

Later career
In January 2010, Leaman was announced as the next chief executive officer of The Guide Dogs for the Blind Association in succession to Bridget Warr. He took up the position in April 2010. Since 2012, he has also been a trustee of the National Council for Voluntary Organisations (NCVO). During his time as CEO of Guide Dogs, he "increased the number of service users by 50%, and overseen double-digit fundraising growth". He stepped down as CEO of Guide Dogs in 2016. In 2017, he became chief executive of the Tall Ships Youth Trust. In January 2022, he took up the role of Diocesan Secretary and CEO at the Diocese of Bristol in the Church of England.

Personal life
In 1999, Leaman married Suzanne Clarke; they are currently separated. He has two sons.

Honours
In the 1993 Queen's Birthday Honours, Leaman was appointed an Officer of the Order of the British Empire (OBE) "for disaster relief services after Hurricane Andrew". In the 2010 New Year Honours, he was appointed a Companion of the Order of the Bath (CB) "for his work on international maritime security".

References

1956 births
Living people
Royal Navy rear admirals
British chief executives
British charity and campaign group workers
Officers of the Order of the British Empire
Companions of the Order of the Bath
Military personnel from Devon
People educated at Torquay Boys' Grammar School
Graduates of Britannia Royal Naval College